The Spooky Men's Chorale is a group of Australian male singers. Most reside in the Blue Mountains region of New South Wales, but some are from Western Australia. Their repertoire consists largely of songs either written or arranged by their director (or "spookmeister") Stephen Taberner, on topics ranging from power tools to covers of ABBA songs. They also perform traditional Georgian music, a major influence on their compositions, harmonies and vocal style.

History
The Spooky Men's Chorale were created by Stephen Taberner and made their first appearance in August 2001 as part of an evening called "This was nearly my life" at Paddington Uniting Church, Sydney. Taberner claims he called up every man he knew who could sing and "taught them 3 songs, and asked them to show up wearing black and with an interesting hat." The three songs were "Vineyard", a Georgian church song, "Georgia", a mock Georgian original, and "The Mess Song". The latter was an existential rumination on the aftermath of breakfast written by New Zealand's Don McGlashan and Harry Sinclair of The Front Lawn.

In the first couple of years the group performed and rehearsed sporadically until the National Folk Festival of Easter 2004, held in Canberra, which effectively launched the group and where, thereafter, they became cult figures. The gig at the National was also the debut of what would become the Spooky theme song ("We are the Spooky Men, We dream of mastodons ...") which typified the brand of humour they were beginning to define. The attention received at the National Folk Festival in 2004 gave rise to a series of opportunities to put their music before a wider audience, and they are now a staple at folk festivals.

Members

The Spooky Men's Chorale typically perform with between 12 and 16 singers, the exact number at any one time depending on the particular circumstances, locations and so on. When touring in the UK and Europe, the group are regularly joined by up to 6 UK based singers. The UK contingent also perform in their own right as A Fistful of Spookies.

Discography

Albums
 Tooled Up (2004)
 Stop Scratching It (2007)
 Urban Sea Shanties (2009) - Fred Smith and the Spooky Men's Chorale
 Deep (2009) with DVD
 The Spooky Man in History (2013)
 Warm (2015)
 Welcome To The Second Half (2019)

EPs
 Big (2011) containing three tracks ("Big", "The Thing", "The Man in the 17th Row")

References

External links
Official website
A Fistful of Spookies

Australian folk music groups